Out of Luck is a 1923 American comedy film directed by Edward Sedgwick and starring Hoot Gibson.

Cast 
 Hoot Gibson as Sam Pertune
 Laura La Plante as Mae Day
 Howard Truesdale as Ezra Day (as Howard Truesdell)
 Elinor Hancock as Aunt Edith Bristol
 DeWitt Jennings as Captain Bristol
 Freeman Wood as Cyril La Mount
 Jay Morley as Boggs
 Kansas Moehring as "Kid" Hogan
 John Judd as "Pig" Hurley

References

External links

1923 films
1923 comedy films
American silent feature films
American black-and-white films
Silent American comedy films
Universal Pictures films
Films directed by Edward Sedgwick
1920s American films